Vishnu Saravanan (born 24 February 1999) is an Indian sailor. He qualified for the Tokyo Olympic Games.

In Croatia in 2019, Vishnu Saravanan won Bronze medal at the Under-21 World Championships, which was his first notable achievement.

References

External links
 
 
 
 

1999 births
Living people
Indian male sailors (sport)
Olympic sailors of India
Sailors at the 2020 Summer Olympics – Laser